Portugal participated in the Junior Eurovision Song Contest 2018 which took place on 25 November 2018 in Minsk, Belarus. The Portuguese broadcaster Rádio e Televisão de Portugal (RTP) was responsible for organising their entry for the contest.

Background

Rádio e Televisão de Portugal (RTP), a member of the European Broadcasting Union (EBU), was responsible for the selection process of participants. Portugal used a national selection format to select contestants, broadcasting a show entitled "Festival da Canção Junior". This was a junior version of Festival da Canção, the national music competition organized by broadcaster RTP to choose the Portuguese entry for the Eurovision Song Contest. The first representative to participate for the nation at the 2006 contest was Pedro Madeira with the song "Deixa-me sentir", which finished in second-last place out of fifteen participating entries, achieving a score of twenty-two points.

Before Junior Eurovision

Júniores de Portugal 2018 
The singer who performed the Portuguese entry for the Junior Eurovision Song Contest 2018 was again selected through the singing competition  ("Juniors of Portugal"). Between 1 September and 15 September 2018, children between the ages of 9 and 14 could submit a video of themselves singing online to try to participate in Junior Eurovision that year. Rádio e Televisão de Portugal (RTP) received over 70 submissions and selected 10 finalists. They took part in live auditions and the winner of the event was decided by a jury. The panel consisted of Nuno Galopim (Portuguese commentator for Eurovision and Junior Eurovision), Pedro Madeira (Portuguese representative in Junior Eurovision 2006), Carla Bugalho (Head Of Delegation for Portugal in Eurovision and Junior Eurovision), Fernando Martins and Sílvia Alberto (Eurovision 2018 host). Although the auditions were not published, it is known that Rita Laranjeira performed 3 songs: "Eu sei", "Somewhere Over The Rainbow" and "I Surrender”.

Song selection 
After Rita Laranjeira's selection, it was announced Portuguese broadcaster RTP had invited a composer to come forward with one or several songs that capture the essence of ”diversity, empathy and modernity”. On 12 October, the song title was announced to be "Gosto de tudo (já não gosto de nada)". The song itself was released on 17 October 2018. The song is about “the way teenagers relate today with the world through social media.” The song was written and composed by João Só who was selected by RTP to write the Portuguese entry. João Só has previously competed as a songwriter in the Portuguese Eurovision selection Festival da Canção in both 2012 and 2016.

Artist and song information

Rita Laranjeira 
Rita Laranjeira (born 3 March 2005) is a Portuguese child singer from Sintra, Portugal. She attends the Sintra Music Conservatoire in the disciplines violin, orchestra, musical training and choir. In 2018, she participated in the MEO Kids Music Fest and Junior Eurovision Song Contest, and in 2020 in The Voice Portugal.

Gosto de tudo (já não gosto de nada)
"Gosto de tudo (já não gosto de nada)" is a song by Portuguese singer Rita Laranjeira. It represented Portugal at the Junior Eurovision Song Contest 2018.

At Junior Eurovision
During the opening ceremony and the running order draw which both took place on 19 November 2018, Portugal was drawn to perform second on 25 November 2018, following Ukraine and preceding Kazakhstan.

Voting

In the contest, Portugal received no points from the professional juries; they received 42 points from the online vote.

Detailed voting results

References

Junior Eurovision Song Contest
Portugal
Junior